Etrumeus is a genus of round herrings in the family, Dussumieriidae.

Species
There are currently seven recognized species in this genus:
 Etrumeus acuminatus Gilbert, 1890 (Eastern Pacific red-eye round herring) 
 Etrumeus golanii DiBattista, J. E. Randall & Bowen, 2012
 Etrumeus makiawa J. E. Randall & DiBattista, 2012
 Etrumeus micropus (Temminck & Schlegel, 1846)
 Etrumeus sadina (Mitchill, 1814) (Atlantic red-eye round herring)
 Etrumeus whiteheadi Wongratana, 1983 (Whitehead's round herring)
 Etrumeus wongratanai DiBattista, J. E. Randall & Bowen, 2012

References

Clupeiformes
Marine fish genera
Taxa named by Pieter Bleeker